Blinov Sports and Concerts Complex (Russian: Спортивно-концертный комплекс им. Виктора Блинова short form: СКК "Блинова" previous name: СКК "Иртыш") is an indoor sporting arena located in Omsk, Russia. The capacity of the arena is 5,500.  It was the home arena of the Avangard Omsk ice hockey team since 1987 till 2007. Today it is a home arena of women's volleyball club Omichka and Avangard affiliated MHL-B team Yastreby Omsk.

The construction began back in the 70s, but later was postponed and frozen for several years. The complex was finished only in 1986 and hosted the first hockey games in February 1987. Before 2001 it was called Irtysh Sports and Concert Complex subsequently changing the name to Blinov Sports and Concert Complex after Viktor Blinov, the first ice hockey Olympic champion from Omsk.

External links
 Official Website of the arena
 Arena profile at ice-arena.info

Indoor ice hockey venues in Russia
Indoor arenas in Russia
Avangard Omsk
Buildings and structures in Omsk Oblast